The Georgian calendar is the ancient or modern calendar of Georgia.

Though Georgia now uses the modern Gregorian calendar, the old names corresponding to the months are still used.

Old month names 

 New Year in ancient Georgia started from September.

Modern month names

See also 
 Georgian numerals
 Georgian alphabet

References

Calendars
Georgian language